Claude Sadio (born 29 October 1943) is a Senegalese basketball player. He competed in the men's tournament at the 1968 Summer Olympics.

References

1943 births
Living people
Senegalese men's basketball players
Olympic basketball players of Senegal
Basketball players at the 1968 Summer Olympics
Basketball players from Dakar